The Prairie Junior Hockey League is a Junior "B" ice hockey league in Saskatchewan, Canada, sanctioned by Hockey Canada.

History 
Originally known as the South Saskatchewan Junior Hockey League (1992–2006) the Prairie Junior Hockey League was founded in 2007–2008 with the merger of the SSJHL and the North Saskatchewan Junior Hockey League (NSJHL).

Previously the playoff winners played-off against the champion of the NSJHL in the Provincial championships (Athol Murray Trophy). Since the amalgamation of the two leagues in 2007, the PJHL has been the only Junior 'B' league in the province; thus its champion has been awarded the provincial title. The provincial champion moves on to compete for the Keystone Cup Western Canadian Junior 'B' championship.

The league draws many players from Saskatchewan. Most teams draft players from nearby towns and cities, though it is not mandatory. Some teams outweigh other teams in the PJHL. For example, the Pilot Butte Storm advanced to the finals eleven years (2005–15) in a row, while the Ochapawace Thunder (0-40-0-0) didn't win a game in the 2015–16 PJHL season.

Teams

Former teams 
 Briercrest College Clippers (1992–1996) - joined the Alberta Colleges Athletic Conference
 Canora Cobras (1995–2001)
 Cypress Cyclones (2005–2014) - withdrew from league after 11 games of the season
 Grenfell Spitfires (1994–1996) - rebranded as Grenfell Storm
Grenfell Storm (1996–2000)
 Moose Jaw Canucks (1992–1994)
 Notre Dame Hounds (1992–1994; 2003–2005)
 Ochapowace Thunder (2008–2016)
 Prince Albert Ice Hawks (2008–2016) - rebranded as Titans
 Prince Albert Titans (2016-2021)
 Regina Express (1993–2001) - relocated to Pilot Butte as Pilot Butte Storm
 Saskatoon Chiefs (1990–2008) - relocated to Delisle
St. Phillips Rangers (1996–2003) - relocated to Carlysle; renamed Moose Mountain Rangers
Moose Mountain Rangers (2003–2007)
 Tri-Town Thunder (2001–2016) - rebranded as Carrot River Thunder
 West Central Rage (2009-2021)

Champions

To see the champions for the North Saskatchewan Junior Hockey League before 2007, see North Saskatchewan Junior B Hockey League

To see the full list of champions of the Athol Murray Trophy, see Athol Murray Trophy

{| class="wikitable"
!Season
!SSJHL Playoff champion
!Runner-up
!Result
!Keystone Cup finish
|-
|1992-93
|Assiniboia Southern Rebels
|Regina Capitals
|
|
|-
|1993-94
|Notre Dame Hounds
|Moose Jaw Canucks
|
|
|-
|1994-95
|Regina Capitals
|Grenfell Spitfires
|
|
|-
|1995-96
|Assiniboia Southern Rebels
|Regina Capitals
|
|Gold medalist
|-
|1996-97
|Grenfell Storm
|Briercrest Clippers
|
|Gold medalist
|-
|1997-98
|St. Phillips Rangers
|Regina Capitals
|
|
|-
|1998-99
|Assiniboia Southern Rebels
|Regina Capitals
|
|
|-
|1999-00
|Assiniboia Southern Rebels
|Fort Knox
|
|
|-
|2000-01
|Assiniboia Southern Rebels
|St. Phillips Rangers
|
|Gold medalist
|-
|2001-02
|Assiniboia Southern Rebels
|St. Phillips Rangers
|4-0 (best-of 7)
|
|-
|2002-03
|Assiniboia Southern Rebels
|Regina Capitals
|4-1 (best-of 7)
|Gold medalist
|-
|2003-04
|Regina Capitals
|
|
|Gold medalist
|-
|2004-05
|Pilot Butte Storm
|Fort Knox
|4-3 (best-of 7)
|DNQ
|-
|2005-06
|Regina Capitals
|Pilot Butte Storm
|4-1 (best-of 7)
|DNQ
|-
|2006-07
|Pilot Butte Storm
|Fort Knox
|4-1 (best-of 7)
|Fort Knox (host) - Silver medalist
|-
|2007-08
|Pilot Butte Storm
|Saskatoon Royals
|4-2 (best-of 7)
|5th
|-
|2008-09
|Saskatoon Royals
|Pilot Butte Storm
|4-1 (best-of 7)
|4th
|-
|2009-10
|Tri-Town Thunder
|Pilot Butte Storm
|4-3 (best-of 7)
|Silver medalist
|-
|2010-11
|Pilot Butte Storm
|Saskatoon Royals
|4-3 (best-of 7)
|Bronze medalist
|-
|2011-12
|Pilot Butte Storm
|Delisle Chiefs
|4-1 (best-of 7)
|Pilot Butte Storm - 6th
Saskatoon Royals (host) - 4th
|-
|2012-13
|Saskatoon Royals
|Pilot Butte Storm
|4-1 (best-of 7)
|Silver medalist
|-
|2013-14
|Saskatoon Quakers
|Pilot Butte Storm
|4-3 (best-of 7)
|5th
|-
|2014-15
|Saskatoon Quakers
|Pilot Butte Storm
|4-0 (best-of 7)
|Bronze medalist
|-
|2015-16
|Saskatoon Quakers
|Regina Capitals
|4-0 (best-of 7)
|Saskatoon Quakers - Silver medalistRegina Capitals (host) - 4th
|-
|2016-17
|Regina Capitals
|Saskatoon Quakers
|4-2 (best-of 7)
|Bronze medalist
|-
|2017-18
|Regina Capitals
|Delisle Chiefs
|4-1 (best-of 7)
|Sask did not send rep
|-
|2018-19
|Regina Capitals
|Saskatoon Quakers
|4-0 (best-of 7)
|Sask did not send rep
|-
|2019-20
|none (COVID-19 pandemic)
| ---
| ---
| ---
|-
|2020-21
|none (COVID-19 pandemic)
| ---
| ---
| ---
|-
|2021-22
|Saskatoon Quakers
|Pilot Butte Storm
|4-1 (best-of 7)
|Sask did not send rep
|}

See also
List of ice hockey leagues
Sport in Saskatchewan#Team sports

References

External links
Prairie Junior Hockey League

Ice hockey leagues in Saskatchewan
B
Hockey Saskatchewan